Airstars, Ltd was a cargo airline based in Moscow, Russia. It was established in 2000 and operated cargo services throughout Russia and eastern Europe. Its main base was Domodedovo International Airport, Moscow. Its license was revoked in 2011 over safety violations regarding hours flown by each plane

Fleet 

The Airstars Airways fleet included the following aircraft (as of 2010)

References

External links

Airstars Airways

Defunct airlines of Russia
Companies based in Moscow
Defunct cargo airlines
Airlines established in 2000
2011 disestablishments in Russia
Airlines disestablished in 2011
Cargo airlines of Russia
Russian companies established in 2000